Guy Standing  (born 9 February 1948) is a British labour economist. He is a professor of development studies at the School of Oriental and African Studies, University of London, and a co-founder of the Basic Income Earth Network (BIEN). Standing has written widely in the areas of labour economics, labour market policy, unemployment, labour market flexibility, structural adjustment policies and social protection. He created the term precariat to describe an emerging class of workers who are harmed by low wages and poor job security as a consequence of globalisation. Since the 2011 publication of his book The Precariat: The New Dangerous Class, his work has focused on the precariat, unconditional basic income, deliberative democracy, and the commons.

Life and career 
Guy Standing gained his bachelor's degree in economics from the University of Sussex in 1971. After taking a masters in labour economics and industrial relations at the University of Illinois, he received his doctorate in economics from the University of Cambridge in 1977.

From 1975 to 2006, Standing worked at the International Labour Organization, latterly as director of the ILO's Socio-Economic Security Programme. The programme was responsible for a major report on socio-economic security worldwide and for creation of the Decent Work Index.

From April 2006 to February 2009, he held a position of Professor of Labour Economics, Monash University, Melbourne, Australia.
In 2006, he became professor of economic security at the University of Bath, leaving in 2013 to become professor of development studies at the School of Oriental and African Studies, University of London. Since October 2015 he has worked in Professorial Research Associate, SOAS, University of London, UK. He was also working on "pilot basic income schemes in India" and on topics connected to his two recent books,
The Precariat: The New Dangerous Class (2011) and A Precariat Charter: From Denizens to Citizens (2014).

In the aftermath of the COVID-19 pandemic, Standing argued in 2021 that the pandemic's consequences showed that a universal basic income was inevitable. Standing has also endorsed a carbon tax as a means to reduce greenhouse gas emissions.

He is a Fellow of the Academy of Social Sciences.

The Precariat 

Standing's best-known book is The Precariat: The New Dangerous Class, published in 2011. In it, he blames globalisation for having plunged more and more people into the precariat, which he analyses as a new emerging social class. According to Standing, the precariat is not only suffering from job insecurity but also identity insecurity and lack of time control, not least due to workfare social policies.

Standing describes the precariat as an agglomerate of several different social groups, notably immigrants, young educated people, and those who have fallen out of the old-style industrial working class.

Standing calls on politicians to make ambitious social reforms towards ensuring financial security as a right. He argues for an unconditional basic income as an important step to a new approach, stating that it would create economic growth. If politicians fail to take the necessary decisions, he predicts a wave of anger and violence, and the rise of far-right parties.

Personal life 
In August 2015, Standing endorsed Jeremy Corbyn's campaign in the Labour Party leadership election.

Bibliography

See also 
 Basic income in the United Kingdom
 Decent work
 Policy Network

References

External links 

 
 Staff profile at SOAS
 Le précariat: "une classe en devenir", interview for French webzine Basta!, October 2012
 , February 2012
 , July 2013

1948 births
Academics of SOAS University of London
Academics of the University of Bath
Alumni of the University of Cambridge
Alumni of the University of Sussex
Universal basic income writers
British economists
Living people
Nonviolence advocates
University of Illinois alumni
Universal basic income in the United Kingdom